In biology, a lorica is a shell-like protective outer covering, often reinforced with sand grains and other particles that some protozoans and loriciferan animals secrete. Usually it is tubular or conical in shape, with a loose case that is closed at one end. An example is the protozoan genus Stentor, in which the lorica is trumpet-shaped. In the tintinnids, the  lorica is frequently transparent and is used as domicile. Halofolliculina corallasia has a lorica that is attached  as an outer structure, and into which it retracts when disturbed.

There are three phases in the formation of lorica: agglomeration in a natural cast; helical extension; and stabilization.

The original meaning of the word is: cuirass, a type of chest armor, originally made  of leather, afterward of plates of metal or horn sewed on linen or the like.

See also
 Chitin
 Periostracum
 Tectin

Notes

Ciliate biology